Cottus scaturigo, the Timavo sculpin, is a species of freshwater ray-finned fish belonging to the family Cottidae, the typical sculpins. It is endemic to the Timavo Spring in Italy. This species was described as a separate species from the European bullhead (C. gobio) in 2005 by Jörg Freyhof, Maurice Kottelat and Arne W. Nolte. However, the Catalog of Fishes treats this taxon as a synonym of Cottus metae, although FishBase treats it as a separate species. The specific name scaturigo means “spouting water”, i.e. a spring, an allusion to the Timavo Spring.

References

scaturigo
Endemic fauna of Italy
Fish described in 2005